Genetic editing (French critique génétique; German genetische Kritik) is an approach to scholarly editing in which an exemplar is seen as derived from a dossier of other manuscripts and events. The derivation can be through physical cut and paste; writing or drawing in a variety of media; quotation, annotation or correction; acts of physical defacement; etc.  Genetic editing aims to reconstruct the sequence of actions on the manuscript and exactly which parts of the manuscript were acted upon. Where multiple manuscripts have been combined (through for example cut and paste or quotation).

Overview 
Whereas traditional scholarly editing can be seen as constructing a new document drawing together and comparing many source documents to cast light on a work, genetic editing closely examines a single extant manuscript and traces back each aspect to cast light on the work. Genetic editing is named by analogy with genetics manuscripts (individuals) are derived from other manuscripts (or previous states of the same manuscript) and with the derivation tree being a partial ordered tree.

Genetic editing models 
Genetic editing is strong in European, particularly French and German, textual scholarship. The German genetic editing, which has been associated with synoptic telescoping has a different method of presentation from the Anglo-American model. The primary model and test case of German editions has been Johann Wolfgang von Goethe while in England and the United States it is William Shakespeare, who did not leave manuscripts of his works. Completed works of genetic editing are known as genetic editions. These documents are similar to documentary editions but it also include information detailing the different phases of writing and rewriting of the manuscript. 

The Text Encoding Initiative's XML format has support for encoding of genetic editions.

Examples 
 HyperNietzsche https://web.archive.org/web/20080706123702/http://www.hypernietzsche.org/
 Ulysses: A Critical and Synoptic Edition (1984; Gabler, Steppe, and Melchior)

References 

Digital humanities
Editing
Textual criticism
Textual scholarship